There are 21 mountain peaks named West Peak in the United States according to the US Geological Survey Geographic Names Information System.

 West Peak Valdez–Cordova  Census Area, Alaska, el. 
 West Peak Aleutians West Census Area, Alaska, 
 West Peak Juneau, Alaska, el. 
 West Peak Nome Census Area, Alaska, el. 
 West Peak Graham County, Arizona, el. 
 West Peak Tuolumne County, California, el. 
 West Peak Marin County, California, el. 
 West Peak Eagle County, Colorado, el. 
 West Peak New Haven County, Connecticut, el. 
 West Peak Piscataquis County, Maine, el. 
 West Peak Somerset County, Maine, el. 
 West Peak Piscataquis County, Maine, el. 
 West Peak Oxford County, Maine, el. 
 West Peak Fergus County, Montana, el. 
 West Peak Madison County, Montana, el. 
 West Peak Coos County, New Hampshire, el. 
 West Peak Grafton County, New Hampshire, el. 
 West Peak Elko County, Nevada, el. 
 West Peak Jefferson County, Washington, el. 
 West Peak Jefferson County, Washington, el. 
 West Peak Kittitas County, Washington, el.

Notes

Lists of mountains of the United States